Packing the Monkeys, Again! (Serbian: Opet pakujemo majmune) is a 2004 Montenegrin drama film directed by Marija Perović.

Plot
Packing the Monkeys, Again! is story about love couple, which live in a small rented apartment. Nebojša is a journalist who works to much, and he asks Jelena to do everything what all traditional Montenegrin women does. Jelana studies literature, and she is suspicious of Nebojša having an affair. Of course, owners of their apartment are coming in their lives and bringing their problems to the house of Nebojša and Jelena — Nata, Dragica's and Dragoljub's daughter is a problematic child. But, the most interesting thing is that, the person who is re-telling this story, is a man with amnesia who doesn't know in which bathroom he fell on his head and writing is a part of his therapy.

Cast
 Andrija Milošević
 Branislav Popović
 James Ard
 Ivona Čović
 Jelena Đokić
 Boro Stjepanović
 Dubravka Vukotić

References

External links 
 

2004 films
Montenegrin drama films
Films shot in Montenegro
Serbian-language films
Montenegrin-language films
Films set in Montenegro
2004 drama films